Danny Gavidia (born January 24, 1963) is a Peruvian film and television director/cinematographer. He is best known for directing the Telemundo series El Señor de los Cielos, Enemigo Intimo and the film Reportaje a la Muerte.

Career 
Gavidia started his career directing Peruvian telenovelas María Emilia, Pobre Diabla, Soledad, Gorrión, Canela and Nino. He went on to direct the telenovela Al Son del Amor for Puerto Rican television. He has been in charge of feature films such as Reportaje a la Muerte, as well as a dozen short films and music videos. 

From 2002 to 2003 he was made Director and Executive Producer of the Discovery Channel Latin America series Casos Medicos. The episodes followed different medical cases happening throughout Caracas, Mexico City, Guadalajara and Buenos Aires.

From 2004 to 2009, Gavidia worked for Telemundo Studios in Miami, where he directed the telenovelas Prisionera, Anita No Te Rajes, El Cuerpo del Deseo, Tierra de Pasiones, La Viuda de Blanco, Pecados Ajenos, Mas Sabe el Diablo, and El Rostro de Analia. He also directed the made-for-TV film El Primer Golpe.

In early 2010 he began directing the second season of Disney-Discovery Channel reality show Amazing Race Latinoamerica. 

Since 2014 he has directed multiple series for Telemundo including El Señor de los Cielos (seasons 1-5), El Chema, Señora Acero (season 3), and Enemigo Intimo. He directed the telenovela El Baron in 2019.

Personal life 
Danny Gavidia was born in Lima, Peru on January 24, 1963.

Filmography

References 

Peruvian television people
Peruvian film directors
1963 births
Living people